Kran may refer to:

 Kran, Kardzhali Province, a village in Kardzhali Province, Bulgaria
 Kran, Stara Zagora Province, a town in Stara Zagora Province, Bulgaria
 Kran Peninsula, peninsula forming the northeast extremity of Liège Island in the Palmer Archipelago, Antarctica
 Kjell Olav Kran (born 1937), Norwegian business administrator and sports official
 KRAN, radio station in America
 "Kran Turismo", a 2012 song by a Finnish rap duo JVG
 Iranian qiran also known as kran

See also
 Kraan (disambiguation)
 Krahn (disambiguation)